The Dubai Branch of former Saint-Petersburg State University of Engineering and Economics,  now a part of the Saint-Petersburg State University of Economics.

The Saint-Petersburg State University of Economics has an International branch outside the Russian Federation in Dubai. It is named Saint-Petersburg State Economic University (Dubai branch). The Dubai Branch was founded in 2005.

See also 
 List of institutions of higher learning in Russia

References

External links 
 Saint-Petersburg State Economic University (Dubai branch)
 ENGECON (home campus) website in English

Universities in Saint Petersburg
Universities and colleges in Dubai
Business schools in Russia
Business schools in the United Arab Emirates
Engineering universities and colleges